Shukurjon Aminova (born 16 November 2002) is an Uzbekistani judoka.

She won a medal at the 2021 World Judo Championships.

References

External links

2002 births
Living people
Uzbekistani female judoka
21st-century Uzbekistani women